Giza Peak is a peak rising to about  on the east side of the Fossil Bluff massif, eastern Alexander Island, Antarctica. For many years this peak was known to the British Antarctic Survey (BAS) workers as "Sphinx," a name already in use. To avoid duplication, the UK Antarctic Place-Names Committee in 1987 applied the name Giza Peak to this feature in reference to the site of the colossal statue of the Sphinx at El Giza, Egypt.

See also

 Gluck Peak
 Khufu Peak
 Oberon Peak

References

Mountains of Alexander Island